Çaytaşı is a village in the Hozat District, Tunceli Province, Turkey. The village is populated by Kurds of the Karabal tribe and had a population of 107 in 2021.

The hamlets of Akveysi, Deliktaş, İbrahim Taner and Sarısu are attached to the village.

References 

Kurdish settlements in Tunceli Province
Villages in Hozat District